The 1978 Pontins Professional was the fifth edition of the professional invitational snooker tournament which took place from April to May 1978 in Prestatyn, Wales.

The tournament featured twelve professional players. Two players advance to the final while the other ten were eliminated in the group stage. All frames were played during the group stage matches.

Ray Reardon won the event, beating John Spencer 7–2 in the final.


Group stage

  Fred Davis 4–1 Alex Higgins 
  Fred Davis 4–1 Perrie Mans 
  Patsy Fagan 3–2 Graham Miles 
  Patsy Fagan 3–2 Ray Reardon 
  Alex Higgins 3–2 Cliff Thorburn 
  Perrie Mans 4–1 Alex Higgins 
  Perrie Mans 4–1 Rex Williams 
  Graham Miles 3–2 Doug Mountjoy 
  Graham Miles 4–1 John Pulman 
  Doug Mountjoy 4–1 Dennis Taylor 
  Doug Mountjoy 4–1 John Pulman 
  Doug Mountjoy 4–1 Patsy Fagan 
  John Pulman 3–2 Patsy Fagan 
  Ray Reardon 3–2 Dennis Taylor 
  Ray Reardon 4–1 Doug Mountjoy 
  Ray Reardon 4–1 John Pulman 
  Ray Reardon 5–0 Graham Miles 
  John Spencer 3–2 Fred Davis 
  John Spencer 3–2 Perrie Mans 
  John Spencer 4–1 Alex Higgins 
  John Spencer 4–1 Cliff Thorburn 
  John Spencer 4–1 Rex Williams 
  Dennis Taylor 3–2 Patsy Fagan 
  Dennis Taylor 4–1 Graham Miles 
  Dennis Taylor 5–0 John Pulman 
  Cliff Thorburn 3–2 Fred Davis 
  Cliff Thorburn 3–2 Rex Williams 
  Cliff Thorburn 4–1 Perrie Mans 
  Rex Williams 3–2 Fred Davis 
  Rex Williams 4–1 Alex Higgins

Final

  Ray Reardon 7–2 John Spencer

References

Pontins Professional
Snooker competitions in Wales
Pontins Professional
Pontins Professional
Pontins Professional
Pontins Professional